The Marconi-RCA Bolinas Transmitting Station, on Mesa Road in Bolinas, Marin County, California, was listed on the National Register of Historic Places in 2018.

The station was built in 1914 and taken over by RCA after World War I.

It is one of six Point Reyes sites listed on the National Register in 2018.

The station is recognized as a cultural landscape-type resource.

It was photographed by Jet Lowe and listed as "Marconi Radio Sites, Transmitting, Point Reyes Station, Marin County, CA," in the Historic American Engineering Record.

See also
Station KPH, Marconi Wireless Telegraph Company of America, Marshall, California
Marconi–RCA Wireless Receiving Station, Chatham, Massachusetts

References

Historic American Engineering Record in California
National Register of Historic Places in Marin County, California
Transport infrastructure completed in 1914
Commercial buildings on the National Register of Historic Places in California
Telecommunications buildings on the National Register of Historic Places